Cyril Moses Picciotto KC (1888 – 9 February 1940), was a British barrister, writer and Liberal Party politician active in Jewish affairs.

Background
Picciotto was born in London, the eldest son of James Picciotto and Mary Benoliel. He was educated at St Paul's School, London and Trinity College, Cambridge. He was awarded the Members’ Prize for Latin Essay in 1909, a First Class Classical Tripos in 1910, a First Class Law Tripos in 1911 and a Whewell Scholar in 1912. In 1915 he married Elaine Elizabeth Solomon. They had two sons.

Professional career
Picciotto was called to the Bar by the Inner Temple in 1913. He worked on the North Eastern Circuit. He was in the Military Department of the India Office from 1915–19. He was Referee, under Widows’ Orphans’ and Old Age Contributory Pensions Acts from 1930–32. He became a King's Council in 1938.

As a writer, his publications included; 
Via Mystica (Essays), 1912
The Relation of International Law to the Law of England and the United States, 1914
St Paul's School, 1939
The Legal Position of the Jews in England as shown in the Plea Rolls of the Jewish Exchequer (in Transactions of the Jewish Historical Society of England)

Jewish affairs
He was a member of the Council of the Jewish Historical Society of England. In 1939 he was appointed to the Spanish and Portuguese Congregation's representative on the Board of Deputies. He was Chairman of the London Area Council for Combating Anti-Semitism.

Political career
Picciotto was Liberal candidate for the St Marylebone division at the 1929 General Election. He finished third. He did not stand for parliament again.

Electoral record

References

1888 births
1940 deaths
Liberal Party (UK) parliamentary candidates
People educated at St Paul's School, London
Alumni of Trinity College, Cambridge
Members of the Inner Temple